Han Tianyu (born 3 June 1996) is a Chinese short-track speed-skater. He won the silver medal in men's 1500 metres short track speed skating at the 2014 Winter Olympics, behind the Canadian skater Charles Hamelin, who won the gold medal.

Early life
In 2002, Tianyu started to practice roller skating when he was only six years old. He was very talented in skating and won 8 national champions and 5 provincial champions during 2002 to 2006. In 2006, 10-year-old Tianyu decided to learn and practice short track speed skating. While there was no professional short track team in Liaoning Province at that time, he went to Changchun, Jilin and started his short track training.

Career
Han Tianyu made his international debut in 2012 World Junior Short Track Speed Skating Championships, Melbourne, where he finished first in super 1500 meters, as well as a silver medal in 500 meters. Finally, he won a bronze medal in the overall ranking. After that competition, he was selected as a Chinese national team skater.

He started to compete in world cups in the 2012–2013 season. He also competed in 2013 World Junior Short Track Speed Skating Championships one year later in Warsaw, Poland. During that championships, he won 2 gold and a silver in single distances and ranked 2nd in  the overall ranking. During the ISU competitions in 2013–2014 season, he showed a lot of improvements and was selected as a competitor in 2014 winter olympic games in Sochi.

On 10 February 2014, Han went on the ice for men's 1500 meters in Winter Olympic Game. He was in the same heat with superstar Victor An and world junior champion in 2013 Park Se-yeong, in both quarterfinals and semifinals. He made a second and a first in the two races and got the chance to be in the final race. In the final race, he stayed in top three during the whole race and in the last few laps still tried to challenge Charles Hamelin, who won the gold medal in the end. Tianyu finished second and Victor got the bronze medal.

On March 12, 2016, Han Tianyu won men's 1500 meters gold medal in World Short Track Speed Skating Championships held in Seoul, which made him the first male Chinese skater to win gold medal in World Championships in 1500m. On 13th, he finished first in the men's 3000 meters superfinal, and won the gold medal of men's overall classification. Han became the second skater who won World Championships Men's overall gold medal in Chinese history (after Li Jiajun).

International Competition Podiums

External links
Han Tianyu's profile , from http://www.sochi2014.com ; retrieved 2014-02-10.

1996 births
Living people
Chinese male short track speed skaters
Olympic short track speed skaters of China
Olympic medalists in short track speed skating
Olympic silver medalists for China
Olympic bronze medalists for China
Short track speed skaters at the 2014 Winter Olympics
Short track speed skaters at the 2018 Winter Olympics
Medalists at the 2014 Winter Olympics
Medalists at the 2018 Winter Olympics
People from Fushun
Asian Games medalists in short track speed skating
Short track speed skaters at the 2017 Asian Winter Games
Asian Games gold medalists for China
Medalists at the 2017 Asian Winter Games
World Short Track Speed Skating Championships medalists
21st-century Chinese people